Wynford Eagle is a hamlet and small parish in Dorset, England, situated approximately  southwest of Maiden Newton and  northwest of Dorchester. Dorset County Council's 2013 mid-year estimate of the parish population is 60.

Toponymy
The village was recorded as Wenfrot in the Domesday Book of 1086, and as Wynfrod Egle in 1288. The name Wynford derives from the Celtic wïnn and frud, meaning a white or bright stream. The affix Eagle derives from the 13th-century manorial L'Aigle family (de Aquila, del Egle).

History
Wynford Eagle parish contains barrows, and Roman remains have been unearthed here, including mosaic pavements, which have led to its identification as a villa site. The parish used to be in the hundred of Tollerford.

In 1788 the village is mentioned in Owen's New Book of Fairs as having a yearly fair on the 21st of August, selling toys.

Manor house
The manor house, now Manor Farm, rebuilt in 1630, was from 1551 for many years the seat of the Puritan Sydenham family, to which belonged the distinguished physician Thomas Sydenham (1624–1689). The family lost the property in scandalous circumstances, the last Sydenham owner dying in Dorchester prison in 1709.

The estate was later acquired by the Best family, originally of Somerset, for whom the title of Baron Wynford was created in 1829. The same family remain the principal landowners.

Church
The church of Saint Lawrence, formerly a chapelry of the church of Toller Fratrum, and later annexed to it as a perpetual curacy, was rebuilt in 1842 but preserves a striking Norman tympanum, carved with two wyverns, probably intended to represent eagles, as a pun on the name of Matilda de l'Aigle, who presumably commissioned it, according to one of the two inscriptions; the other names the sculptor, Alvy or Alvi.

Today, the church is little used. At Christmas there is a small service.

References

External links

 

Villages in Dorset